The Hankou–Danjiangkou railway or Handan railway, is a railroad in central China between Wuhan and Danjiangkou in Hubei Province. The line was built from 1958 to 1966 and double-tracked in 2009. Major cities and towns along route include Wuhan, Anlu, Suizhou, Zaoyang, Xiangyang, Laohekou and Danjiangkou.

This line along with Xiangyang–Chongqing Railway is the traditional route linking Sichuan and Chongqing with Eastern China. After the completion of Yichang-Wanzhou Railway the line's importance decreased slightly but many conventional trains still use this route.

Rail connections
 Wuhan: Beijing–Guangzhou railway, Wuhan–Jiujiang railway, Wuhan–Guangzhou high-speed railway, Hefei–Wuhan passenger railway
 Sui County: Xiaolin–Lishan railway
 Xiangyang: Jiaozuo–Liuzhou railway, Xiangyang–Chongqing railway

See also

 List of railways in China

References

Railway lines in China
Rail transport in Hubei
Rail transport in Jiangxi
Railway lines opened in 1966